Under the Whyte notation for the classification of steam locomotives, 4-2-2-0 represents the wheel arrangement of four leading wheels on two axles, four powered but uncoupled driving wheels on two axles, and no trailing wheels. The arrangement became known as double single.

Usage

This very unusual wheel arrangement was first used 1893 by Frederick Charles Winby for the locomotive James Toleman, built by Hawthorn Leslie & Company. It was exhibited at the World’s Columbian Exposition in Chicago and then delivered to the Milwaukee Road.

Between 1897 and 1901 Dugald Drummond of the London and South Western Railway used this wheel arrangement on two classes of divided drive locomotives, the T7 and E10 classes. The absence of coupling rods enabled the driving wheels to be more widely spaced than on a 4-4-0 locomotive and permitted the inclusion of a larger firebox

Seven locomotives of the type were built which performed adequately, but also displayed disadvantages over a 4-4-0 and so the type was not perpetuated.

References

 
22,4-2-2-0
Railway locomotives introduced in 1897